Gwangju Science Academy for the Gifted is one of the science schools in South Korea, located in Gwangju. It was opened in March 1984 as Jeonnam Science High School (전남과학고등학교) which was changed to the current name in 1990. Gwangju Science High School is known as a science specialized magnet school for students who want to major in science, mathematics and engineering in university.

Korea's first astronaut, Yi So-Yeon, is an alumnus of this school.

See also
Gyeonggi Science High School
Seoul Science High School
Yi So-Yeon

References

External links
 Gwangju Science Academy Official site

Science high schools in South Korea
Educational institutions established in 1984
1984 establishments in South Korea